is a Japanese anime television series which first aired from February 3, 1979, to January 26, 1980, on every Saturday from 6:30 pm to 7:00 pm with a total of 52 episodes. It is the third show in the sequence of "Time Bokan Series" produced by Tatsunoko Productions. It was preceded by Yatterman and succeeded by Rescueman.

Plot
Dr. Monja is a scientist, who is curious about the nature of the legendary "Elixir of Life" which grants the user eternal lifetimes and forever youth. He built a device called the "Time Tunnel" in order to let a team of youngsters to start a quest down the timeline and various spaces to find an exact answer. The Akudama Trio, however, is also seemingly after exactly the same thing. Who will get it first?

Cast

Heroes
: (Voiced by Yūji Mitsuya) The lab assistant of Dr Monja aged 13. Like his counterpart Tanpei in the show Time Bokan, he is sporty and quite capable at mechanics.
: (Voiced by Kumiko Takizawa)
: (Voiced by Yōko Asagami→ Ai Sakuma)
: (Voiced by Kouhei Miyauchi)

Villains
: (Voiced by Noriko Ohara)
: (Voiced by Jouji Yanami)
: (Voiced by Kazuya Tatekabe)
: (Voiced by Masaru Ikeda)
: (Voiced by Yoshito Miyamura)

Other characters
Narrator: Kei Tomiyama

Episodes

References

External links
 

1979 anime television series debuts
Fuji TV original programming
Science fiction anime and manga
Tatsunoko Production
Time Bokan Series
Japanese time travel television series